Plutarch, (died 105) served as Bishop of Byzantium for sixteen years (89 – 105 AD) in succession to Polycarp. When he died, he was buried in the church of Argyroupolis, as were his predecessors.

The persecution of Christians by Emperor Trajan took place in 98, during the bishopric of Plutarch.

See also 
See Plutarch at List of Patriarchs from the official website of the Ecumenical Patriarchate.

1st-century Romans
2nd-century Romans
Roman-era Byzantines
2nd-century Byzantine bishops
1st-century Byzantine bishops
Bishops of Byzantium
105 deaths
Year of birth unknown